Alexandre Alexandrovitch Kniazev (born 26 April 1961 in Moscow) is a Russian cellist and organist. He was named best musician of the year in Russia in 1999.

Kniazev studied music at Moscow Conservatory.

He entered the cello class of Alexander Fedorchenko and in the organ class of G. Kozlova.

After a solid musical formation, he won first prizes in cello at the Vilnius competition, at that of G. Cassado, the International Chamber Music Competition in Trapini, and Pretoria.
He also won the third prize of the International Tchaikovsky Competition of Moscow.

He then performed all over the world and realized many records, two of which were awarded.

Discography 
J. Brahms: Piano Trio No. 3 in C minor op. 101 no.3, Piano Quartet No. 3 in C minor op. 60 no.3 Suoni e Colori (1999)
F. Chopin: Cello sonata in G minor op. 65
J. Brahms: Four serious songs for baritone and piano (arr. Kniazev)
R. Schumann: Three Fantasies, Pieces op. 73
J. Guillou: Fantasia Concertante for cello and organ
J. S. Bach: Cello Suites (1999)
J. S. Bach: Chaconne for Partita No. 2 in D minor for violin (2000)
L. Beethoven: Violin sonata No. 5 in F major op. 24 "Spring" 
F. Schubert: Duet for violin and piano in A major op. 162 D574 
J. Brahms: Scherzo for violin and piano "F.A.E. Sonata" (2001)
J. Brahms: Piano Quartet No. 1 in G minor op. 25 no. 1 
J. Brahms: Clarinet Trio in A minor op. 114 (2001)
M. Reger: Four Sonatas for Cello and Piano (2001)
J. S. Bach: Cello Suites (2004)
S. Rachmaninov: Trio "elegiaque" No. 2 in D minor op. 9
D. Shostakovich: Piano Trio No. 2 in E minor op. 67 (2005)
P. I. Tchaikovsky: Variations on a Rococo Theme, Andante cantabile, Nocturne in E minor
P. I. Tchaikovsky: Twelve Romances (2005)
F. Chopin: Cello sonata in G minor op. 65
S. Rachmaninov: Cello Sonata in G minor op.19
S. Rachmaninov: Vocalise op.34 n.14 (2006)

External links 
 Alexander Kniazev
 Alexander Kniazev on Homestead.com
 Alexander Kniazev on Mariinsky Theatre
 Alexander Kniazev (Cello, Organ) on Bach Cantatas Website
 News - cello - Alexander Kniazev on The XV International Tchaikovsky Competition
 Brahms - Sonata no.1 op.38 - Alexander Kniazev & Andrei Korobeinikov on YouTube

Musicians from Moscow
1961 births
Russian classical cellists
Russian organists
Male organists
20th-century organists
Moscow Conservatory alumni
Prize-winners of the International Tchaikovsky Competition
Living people
21st-century organists